The Buck Pets were an American alternative rock band formed in the late 1980s in Dallas, Texas. They were clearly influenced by earlier bands such as The Replacements, Buzzcocks and The Jesus and Mary Chain but incorporated better production values and more overt nods to classic rock than their college rock/punk predecessors.

The band seemed to get a degree of support from their record label, Island, for their first two LPs, the hard edged The Buck Pets, and the more melodic follow up Mercurotones. On the eve of the release of Mercurotones, Island was bought by PolyGram- the A&R staff were let go and projects were shelved while the new owners evaluated their new property. Support for The Buck Pets was then almost non-existent.

The band also had opening spots on tour with larger acts such as Neil Young (Ragged Glory Tour) and Jane's Addiction, but in the end, The Buck Pets failed to see commercial success. 

As a coda, The Buck Pets released the more restrained, melancholy album To the Quick in 1993 on the independent label Restless.

On April 10, 2010, The Buck Pets reunited for a one night show at the club Trees in the Deep Ellum area of Dallas, Texas and released RARES (and unreleased) a collection of rare and previously unreleased material.

Members
Tony Alba – drums
Ian Beach – bass
Ricky Pearson – drums (To the Quick)
Chris Savage – guitar, vocals
Chuck Smith – bass (The Sound of Deep Ellum)
Andy Thompson – guitar, lead vocals

Discography
Albums
The Buck Pets (Island, 1989)
Mercurotones (Island, 1990)
To the Quick (Restless, 1993)
RARES (and unreleased) (Self-published, 2010)

Singles

References

External links
 Official website:  http://www.buckpets.com/
 Mic The Tiger:  https://web.archive.org/web/20100409072015/http://www.micthetiger.com/
 Atlas Throat:  http://www.myspace.com/atlasthroat

Musical groups from Dallas
Alternative rock groups from Texas
Musical groups established in 1986
Musical groups disestablished in 1993
Musical groups reestablished in 2010